Heino Pehk (born 25 December 1940 in Põlva County, Estonia) is Estonian choir conductor and music teacher.

Biography 
1955-1959 studied accordion in Tartu Music School.

1960-1965 studied choir conducting in Tallinn State Conservatory with Arvo Ratassepp.

He has taught accordion more than 50 years from 1959 till 2010 in Võru Music School (only from 1960-1964 in Tallinn Music School)

He is the chief conductor of Võru Male Choir since 1965 till present.

He has also worked as a conductor with many other vocal ensembles and choirs:

1964-1966 - Female vocal group Sõsara (Sisters); 1965-2000 - Mixed Choir Cantus (based on music teachers of Võru County); 1973 - Võru Boys Choir; 1980-2000 - Võru Male Ensemble and since 1994 till present he works with Ensemble of Soldier's Union of Võru.

Awards 
 1975 - The honorary title - The Honorary Artist of the Estonian Soviet Socialistic Republic
 2009 - The Order of Võru County's coat of arms (the highest recognition for citizens of the county)
 2014 - Medal of the Order of the White Star

References 

1940 births
Living people
Recipients of the Order of the White Star, Medal Class
Estonian musicians